Enzo Concina (born 21 June 1962) is a Canadian retired soccer player who played as a defender. Born in Italy, his family moved to Mississauga, Ontario when he was four years old.

Club career
Concina played in the National Soccer League in 1982 with Toronto Italia. He played Professional club football in Italy for Ravenna, Cesena, Pavia, Piacenza, Monza, Nola, Forli, and in Canada for the Montreal Impact.
He worked for SSC Napoli as technical assistant to Walter Mazzarri.  He worked as assistant coach for D.C. United in 2014. and in the same role for the Montreal Impact in January 2015.

International career
Concina made his debut for Canada in a July 1988 friendly match against Poland and immediately scored his first goal for Canada. He earned a total of 4 caps with the Senior team, scoring 1 goal. He has not represented Canada in any FIFA World Cup qualification matches but did play at the 1993 CONCACAF Gold Cup, his final international coming at that tournament, a 0-8 demolition by Mexico.

Honours

Club
Montreal Impact
 American Professional Soccer League Champion: 1994.

References

External links
 

1962 births
Living people
People from Prato Carnico
Soccer players from Mississauga
Italian emigrants to Canada
Naturalized citizens of Canada
Association football central defenders
Italian footballers
Canadian soccer players
Canadian expatriate soccer players
Canada men's international soccer players
Serie B players
Toronto Italia players
Ravenna F.C. players
A.C. Cesena players
F.C. Pavia players
Piacenza Calcio 1919 players
A.C. Monza players
Montreal Impact (1992–2011) players
Canadian National Soccer League players
American Professional Soccer League players
1993 CONCACAF Gold Cup players
D.C. United non-playing staff
CF Montréal non-playing staff
Footballers from Friuli Venezia Giulia